German submarine U-274 was a Type VIIC U-boat of Nazi Germany's Kriegsmarine during World War II.

The submarine was laid down on 9 January 1942 at the Bremer Vulkan yard at Bremen-Vegesack as yard number 39. She was launched on 19 September 1942 and commissioned on 7 November under the command of Oberleutnant zur See Günther Jordan.

Design
German Type VIIC submarines were preceded by the shorter Type VIIB submarines. U-274 had a displacement of  when at the surface and  while submerged. She had two shafts and two  propellers.

U-274 was fitted with five  torpedo tubes (four fitted at the bow and one at the stern), fourteen torpedoes, one  SK C/35 naval gun, 220 rounds, and two twin  C/30 anti-aircraft guns. The boat had a complement of between forty-four and sixty.

Service history
U-274 served with the 8th U-boat Flotilla for training from November 1942 to July 1943 and operationally with the 7th U-boat Flotilla from 1 August 1943. She carried out two patrols, but sank no ships.

She carried out short voyages between Kiel in Germany and Bergen and Trondheim in Norway over August 1943.

First patrol
The boat departed Trondheim on 1 September 1943 and returned to the Norwegian port twelve days later on the 13th.

Second patrol and loss
For her second sortie, the boat headed toward the Atlantic Ocean, via the gap between Iceland and the Faroe Islands.

The pilot of the Liberator was a Swiss national serving in the RAF. The intercom in the aircraft had been inadvertently left connected to the radio. As a result, ships of the nearby convoy escort heard an improvised commentary which was a great encouragement.

References

Bibliography

External links

German Type VIIC submarines
U-boats commissioned in 1942
U-boats sunk in 1943
U-boats sunk by British aircraft
World War II submarines of Germany
World War II shipwrecks in the Atlantic Ocean
1942 ships
Ships built in Bremen (state)
U-boats sunk by depth charges
U-boats sunk by British warships
Ships lost with all hands
Maritime incidents in October 1943